David Glyn Bowen (1933–2000) was a Welsh Congregationalist minister and missionary. He grew up in the Swansea area and attended Swansea Grammar School (1945–1952). He subsequently studied at University College, Cardiff, graduating in 1955 with an honours degree in Hebrew. He later studied at Memorial College, Brecon (where he began to learn Welsh), and University of Princeton, United States where in 1959 he was awarded the degree of MTh. for a thesis on the Church of South India. On his return to the UK in 1960, he took up the appointment of minister of Castle Street Congregational Church, Tredegar, Monmouthshire. In 1963 he married, and under the patronage of the London Missionary Society he and his wife travelled to Western Samoa where David was appointed Principal of Malua Theological College, he remained in the position for the next five years. He returned to the UK 1968 on appointment to a teaching post in Stepney, East London. Subsequently, he was appointed lecturer in Religious Studies at Bradford Training College and he remained there until 1999, when he retired form the position.

His published writings include ‘The Sathya Sai Baba Hindu Community in Bradford’ (the subject of his PhD (Leeds) thesis), and ‘Who's Jesus Anyway?’, a poem by him which was published in 'Coracle', the official publication of the Iona Community (Scotland).

He died of cancer in May 2000. His funeral was held at Little Lane Church, Bradford.

References 

1933 births
2000 deaths
Welsh Congregationalist ministers
Missionary educators
Welsh Congregationalist missionaries
Congregationalist missionaries in Samoa
British expatriates in Samoa
20th-century Congregationalist ministers